Gunnery Sergeant (GySgt)  is the seventh enlisted rank in the United States Marine Corps, above staff sergeant and below master sergeant and first sergeant, and is a staff non-commissioned officer (SNCO). It has a pay grade of E-7.

The gunnery sergeant insignia consists of two M1 Garands centered vertically between three chevrons and two rockers.

Responsibilities

Gunnery sergeants in infantry units typically serve in the billet of "company gunnery sergeant" or as the platoon sergeant of 23–69 Marines in a reconnaissance platoon or a crew-served weapons platoon (i.e., machine guns, mortars, assault weapons/rockets, and anti-tank missiles). In artillery batteries, gunnery sergeants serve as the "battery gunnery sergeant" in the headquarters section of the firing battery's 94-member firing platoon. In tank and assault amphibian units gunnery sergeants may serve as a platoon sergeant of a 16-member platoon of four tanks or a 39-member platoon of 12 amphibious assault vehicles (AAVs), respectively. Tank and assault amphibian gunnery sergeants are also assigned as section leaders, in charge of either two tanks and 8 Marines or three AAVs and 9 Marines. Gunnery sergeants serving as platoon sergeants perform essentially the same duties as staff sergeant platoon sergeants, with the additional responsibility of supervising other staff non-commissioned officers (i.e., the gunnery/staff sergeants leading the organic sections of the platoon).

The company/battery gunnery sergeant serves as the unit's operations chief and works with the executive officer to plan and coordinate unit training and operations. In combat, as a member of the unit's command group, he/she serves as a tactical adviser to the commanding officer/battery commander regarding employment of the unit and assists in operating the command post or tactical operations center. In garrison, he/she is responsible to the company/battery commander for supervising and coordinating individual training for the enlisted members of the company or battery and may assist the company/battery first sergeant in the administration and non-tactical leadership of the unit and by supervising the property (logistics) NCO, advising the officers, mentoring subordinate ranking Marines, and performing other duties as assigned. The company/battery gunnery sergeant has been described as a "hands on disciplinarian". An approximate former equivalent in the United States Army would have been "field first sergeant".

Gunnery sergeants also serve as senior staff non-commissioned officers in military staff sections and headquarters and service companies and headquarters batteries at battalion/squadron, regiment/group, and division/wing headquarters levels. Typical gunnery sergeant billets in combat support companies and battalion, regiment, and division headquarters are: Personnel Administration Chief, Staff Secretary Personnel/Administration Clerk, Administration Assistance Chief, Division Reproduction NCO, Equal Opportunity Advisor, Human Affairs NCO, Career Planner, Intelligence Chief, Operations Chief, Operations Assistant, Watch Team NCOIC, Schools Coordinator, MAGTF Plans Chief, Cinematography Specialist, Logistics Chief, Embarkation Chief, Infantry Weapons Chief, Analyst and Review Fiscal Chief, Information Systems Maintenance Chief, Public Affairs Chief, Communications-Electronics Maintenance Section Chief, Radio Chief, Wire Chief, Motor Transport Chief, Battery Motor Transport Chief, Roadmaster, Assistant Roadmaster, Maintenance Chief, Assistant Maintenance Chief, Management Team Inspector, Engineer Equipment Chief, and Mess Manager.

In Command Element, Combat Logistics Element, and Aviation Combat Element organizations, gunnery sergeants serve in basically similar positions of responsibility, authority, and accountability as their Ground Combat Element counterparts, with perhaps slightly different titles, such as Division/Branch Chief/NCOIC or Department SNCOIC (Staff Non-Commissioned Officer-In-Charge) in the aircraft maintenance department of a Marine aircraft squadron. Non Fleet Marine Force (or other operating forces) assignments may include supervisory or staff positions in recruiting, drill instructor, Marine Security Guard, Naval ROTC instructor or service school instructor, and major/joint/combined headquarters commands.

History and insignia

The rank of gunnery sergeant in the Marine Corps was established by the Navy personnel act of March 3, 1899 reflecting the duties of Marines in ship's detachments. The original insignia was three chevrons point up with three straight "ties" with an insignia of a bursting bomb over a crossed rifle and naval gun. From 1904 to 1929 the insignia went to three stripes only over a bursting bomb on top of crossed rifles. In 1929, like the rank of first sergeant, two "rockers" were added beneath the stripes with the same insignia in the middle. In 1937 the middle insignia was dropped. The rank was replaced by technical sergeant in 1946 until restored in 1959, when the crossed rifles insignia were added to Marine chevrons.

Qualifications

The qualifications and selection of gunnery sergeants in the "Old Corps" was explained in congressional testimony in 1912:

The following qualifications are required for appointment to the rank of gunnery sergeant:

A candidate for appointment as gunnery sergeant in the United States Marine Corps should be sufficiently proficient in the drill regulations to thoroughly drill recruits and to drill the squad and company. They should be thoroughly conversant with the nomenclature of the rapid-fire and machine guns used in the naval service and be sufficiently acquainted with their drill to be able to act as gun captains and to instruct the enlisted in their duties at such guns. They should have knowledge of the kinds and quantities of ammunition used in those guns. They should have a thorough knowledge of the instructions pertaining to target practice. They should have sufficient knowledge of the system of accountability of the United States Marine Corps to take charge of and properly render the accounts of a guard aboard ship, and should be competent in all respects to perform the duties of a first sergeant in charge of a guard on ship to which no marine officer is attached; also a knowledge of the duties involved in the subsistence of Marines ordered on detached duty, as well as the duties of an officer in command of a part of a landing party on shore.

Gunnery sergeants are selected from the sergeants of the corps on account of superior intelligence, reliability, and mechanical knowledge. The grade was provided with the idea that they should be somewhat higher in standard than first sergeants; that their knowledge of ordnance and of gunnery should be such that they would be able to make minor repairs to guns—to supervise all work in connection with guns; to command detachments which were of such size as not to warrant a commissioned officer being assigned to them. They are at present in command of marine detachments at naval magazines; are performing duty as first sergeants of regularly organized companies at various posts; in connection with the repair of guns at various Marine Corps stations; in connection with the training of recruits; and, in general, performing duties that require the utmost reliability. For a number of years candidates for promotion to this grade were required to take a special course of instruction before receiving their warrants, but recently, because of the lack of first sergeants and the numerous small detachments organized, it has been necessary to detail many of them for duty as first sergeants. As soon as there are a sufficient number of first sergeants available, it is intended to reestablish the school and to give gunnery sergeants a thorough course of instruction prior to their permanent appointment to this grade, in order that they may be experts in all matters pertaining to the care and preservation of naval ordnance.

At the time of this congressional testimony there were 82 gunnery sergeants in the USMC.

Culture
Gunnery sergeants are commonly referred to by the informal abbreviation "Gunny" or "Guns". These nicknames, which are usually regarded as titles of both esteem and camaraderie, are generally acceptable for use in all but formal and ceremonial situations. Use of the term by lower-ranking personnel, however, remains at the gunnery sergeant's discretion.

Notable gunnery sergeants

John Basilone
Elmo M. Haney
Jack Coughlin
R. Lee Ermey (honorary post-service promotion)
Carlos Hathcock
Jimmie E. Howard
Robert H. McCard
Nick Popaditch
William G. Walsh
Jesus "Gunny" Flores

In popular culture

Leroy Jethro Gibbs in CBS TV series NCIS,  portrayed by Mark Harmon
Vince Carter in TV series Gomer Pyle, U.S.M.C., portrayed by Frank Sutton
Hartman in the 1987 war film Full Metal Jacket, portrayed by R. Lee Ermey
Thomas Highway in 1986 war film Heartbreak Ridge, portrayed by Clint Eastwood
Asher "Sarge" Mahonin in 2005 film Doom, portrayed by Dwayne Johnson
Bob Lee Swagger in the novel series created by Stephen Hunter starting with Point of Impact and the 2007 film and the 2016 TV series Shooter based upon it.
Aloysius "Tector" Murphy in TNT series Falling Skies, played by Ryan Robbins
Emil Foley in the 1982 movie An Officer and a Gentleman, played by Louis Gossett Jr.
Erin Mathias in the 2004 remake of Battlestar Galactica
Apone in the 1986 film Aliens, portrayed by Al Matthews
Bobbie Draper in the TV series The Expanse, portrayed by Frankie Adams
Alva Bricker in the TV series Major Dad, portrayed by Beverly Archer
Earl Darnell in the film Second in Command, portrayed by Razaaq Adoti
Edward Buck from the Halo series of video games, portrayed by Nathan Fillion
Barton Geddes in Ip Man 4: The Finale, portrayed by Scott Adkins
Torin Kerr in the Confederation novels of Tanya Huff
 Giuseppe Michelangelo Guicciardini, Jr. ("The Ginny Gunny"), principal character in The Vicar of Christ by Walter F. Murphy

See also
List of comparative military ranks
 United States Marine Corps rank insignia

References

External links
HBO: The Pacific: John Basilone
Example platoon sergeant job descriptions

Military ranks of the United States Marine Corps
United States military enlisted ranks